The 2013 Delaware Fightin' Blue Hens football team represented the University of Delaware as a member of the Colonial Athletic Association (CAA) during the 2013 NCAA Division I FCS football season. Led by first-year head coach Dave Brock, the Fightin' Blue Hens compiled an overall record of 7–5 with a mark of 4–4 in conference play, placing in a three-way tie for fifth in the CAA. The team played home games at Delaware Stadium in Newark, Delaware.

Previous season

Delaware started 2012 strong with a four-game winning streak over West Chester, Delaware State, Bucknell, and William & Mary. After their peak at #9 in the polls, the Hens finished the season by losing six out of their final seven games, with the only victory against Rhode Island. Former coach K. C. Keeler was fired in January 2013, and most of the staff was released with his departure.

Preseason

Recruiting class
The Blue Hens received 12 letters of intent on National Signing Day, February 6, 2013.

Transfers
On February 6, 2013, it was announced that Delaware added two transfers for the 2013 season: junior linebacker Kennedy Ogbonna from ASA The College For Excellence and junior running back Jordan Thomas from Rutgers University. Greyshirted linebacker Eric Patton was added to the roster for the 2013 season as well.

Preseason awards
Sean Baner
CFPA Preseason Placekicker Watch List
The Sports Network Preseason All-American Second Team

Michael Johnson
CFPA Kick Returners to Watch

Bobby Kennedy
CAA Preseason All-Conference First Team

Zach Kerr
The Sports Network Preseason All-American Second Team
Phil Steele Preseason All-American First Team
CAA Preseason All-Conference First Team
College Sports Journal FCS Preseason All-American First Team

Andrew Pierce
The Sports Network Preseason All-American Third Team
Walter Payton National Player of the Year Watch List
College Sports Journal FCS Preseason All-American Second Team

Jeff Williams
CFPA Preseason Linebacker Watch List
Phil Steele Preseason All-American Third Team
College Sports Journal FCS Preseason All-American Second Team

Conference predictions
Delaware was predicted to finish sixth in the CAA Preseason Poll.
CAA Preseason Poll:
1. Villanova (11 First Place Votes)
2. Towson (3)
3. New Hampshire (3)
4. Richmond (1)
5. James Madison (4)
6. Delaware
7. Stony Brook
8. Maine
9. William & Mary
10. Albany
11. Rhode Island

Preseason rankings

FCS Coaches Poll
Delaware received 47 points in the Preseason Coaches Poll, resulting in the 30th highest total. Four of Delaware's CAA opponents received a Top 25 ranking (#9 Villanova, #12 Towson, #14 Richmond, and #15 James Madison). Three additional opponents, two from the CAA, for the season received votes (Wagner, Maine, and Albany).

The Sports Network FCS Poll
Delaware received 130 points in the Preseason Sports Network FCS Poll, placing them in 32nd. Of the CAA opponents that the Hens will face in 2013, four received a Top 25 position: #5 Villanova, #11 Towson, #15 Richmond, and #19 James Madison. In addition, three opponents for 2013 received votes: Wagner, Albany, and William & Mary.

Schedule

Opening depth chart

Coaching staff

Game summaries

Jacksonville

Sources:

Delaware State

Navy

     
     
     
     
     
     
     
     
     

Navy was coming off a loss to Arizona State in the Kraft Fight Hunger Bowl in 2012.
Most lopsided Navy win in series all-time.
Navy would go on to play in the Armed Forces Bowl, defeating Middle Tennessee.

Wagner

     
     
     
     
     
     
     
     
     

Wagner was coming off a share of the NEC championship and a Second Round loss to Eastern Washington in 2012.

James Madison

Maine

     
     
     
     
     
     
     
     
     
     
     
     
     

Most lopsided Maine win in series all-time.
First time Delaware allowed 60+ points in regulation since a September 24, 1921, loss to Pennsylvania (89–0).
Maine would go on to win the CAA championship, and fall in the Second Round to New Hampshire.

Albany

     
     
     
     
     
     
     
     
     
     
     

Albany was coming off a share of the NEC championship in 2012.

Rhode Island

Towson

     
     
     
     
     
     
     
     
     
     

Towson was coming off a shared CAA championship in 2012.
Towson would go on to play in the National Championship Game, falling to North Dakota State.

William & Mary

Richmond

     
     
     
     
     
     
     
     
     
     
     
     
     
     

Richmond was coming off a shared CAA championship in 2012.

Villanova

     
     
     
     
     
     
     
     
     
     
     
     

Villanova was coming off a shared CAA championship, and a First Round loss to Stony Brook in 2012.

Postseason
Following the losing streak to close the season, the Blue Hens failed to qualify for the playoffs.

Conference standings
Team (change from preseason prediction)
1. Maine (−7)
2. Towson (even)
3. New Hampshire (even)
4. Villanova (+3)
5. Richmond (+1)
6. William & Mary (−3)
7. Delaware (+1)
8. Stony Brook (even)
9. James Madison (+4)
10. Rhode Island (−1)
11. Albany (+1)

Postseason awards
Nick Boyle
Second Team CAA All-Conference (Tight End) 
First Team College Sports Madness All-Conference (Tight End) 
Pat Callaway
Second Team CAA All-Conference (Linebacker) 
Third Team College Sports Madness All-Conference (Linebacker) 
Eric Enderson
Second Team CAA All-Conference (Punter) 
First Team College Sports Madness All-Conference (Punter) 
Brandon Heath
Third Team CAA All-Conference (Offensive Line) 
Second Team College Sports Madness All-Conference (Offensive Line) 
Michael Johnson
Second Team CAA All-Conference (Wide Receiver) 
First Team College Sports Madness All-Conference (Wide Receiver) 
Rob Jones
First Team CAA All-Conference (Punt Returner) 
First Team College Sports Madness All-Conference (Punt Returner) 
Bobby Kennedy
Second Team CAA All-Conference (Offensive Line) 
Third Team College Sports Madness All-Conference (Offensive Line) 
Zach Kerr
First Team CAA All-Conference (Defensive Line) 
Second Team College Sports Madness All-Conference (Defensive Line) 
Third Team Beyond Sports Network All-American (Defensive Line)
Second Team The Sports Network All-American (Defensive Line) 
2014 East-West Shrine Game invitee
Andrew Pierce
Second Team CAA All-Conference (Running Back)
Third Team College Sports Madness All-Conference (Running Back)

Ranking movements

References

Delaware
Delaware Fightin' Blue Hens football seasons
Delaware Fightin' Blue Hens football